Kiingi Tuheitia Portraiture Award is a biennial portraiture award in New Zealand, hosted by the New Zealand Portrait Gallery Te Pūkenga Whakaata in partnership with the Office of the Kīngitanga. The award is named for the Māori King, Kiingi Tuheitia; it was launched in August 2020 and was first presented in 2021.

The award is preceded by a competition, encouraging Māori artists to create portraits of their tūpuna (ancestors) in any visual medium. A panel of judges selects finalists from the competition entries and these works are shown in a three-month long exhibition, hosted by The New Zealand Portrait Gallery Te Pūkenga Whakaata and timed to coincide with Matariki. Following the closure of the inaugural award competition exhibition in August 2021, the exhibition will tour the country for two years, followed by a second competition.

2021 competition 
The inaugural competition in 2021 attracted 128 entries; 50 finalists were selected and exhibited in the award exhibition. The judging panel selected a first prize winner, a runner-up and awarded 13 Honourable Mentions. The judges were Sir Derek Lardelli, Kura Te Waru Rewiri and Lisa Reihana.

References 

New Zealand art awards
2020 establishments in New Zealand